Mithuna Raashi is an Indian Kannada language television drama that premiered on Colors Kannada from 28 January 2019 to 27 February 2022.

Raashi, an independent girl, drives an auto-rickshaw to provide for her family. But, her life takes an unexpected turn when she reluctantly marries Mithun, the arrogant owner of a cab company.

Plot summary 
Upon learning from Samarth that he is staying alone from a young age, Mithun enquires the matter. He is surprised to learn that he has a family. Girija was happy as she learns that Samarth is her lost son Babu. Girija becomes emotional after Babu's arrival for a short stay and spends some quality time with him. Mithun, who searches for her, enquires Raashi and upon hearing Girija's voice, he goes towards her room. Upon witnessing Girija and Samarth having an emotional conversation, Mithun grows suspicious and confronts them about the reason for their concern. To prevent Mithun from learning about Samarth's identity, Girija diverts him with a story. Anuradha is left shocked when Suraksha reveals her true intentions behind marrying Samarth.

As she alerts of Suraksha's plans for Girija, Suraksha threatens that Raashi's marriage will be in jeopardy as she knew Samarth's true identity. When Mithun reveals that he hates Samarth, Girija faints. Kavitha pushes Girija off the stairs. While the doctor suggests physiotherapy for Girija's recovery, Kavitha suggests Samarth's name and proposes that he and Suraksha stay at their place till Girija recovers. Mithun completes the first part of the ritual by carrying Raashi in his arms while climbing the stairs. To prove that Raashi is a good wife and an ideal daughter-in-law, the priest asks her to identify the empty and the water-filled pots without touching the containers. Mithun suggests Raashi spill the secret that she wanted to tell him. Raashi reveals that Samarth is his brother Babu. Mithun decides to confront Girija and Samarth about the truth. Mithun accuses Samarth of playing with his feelings. Kavitha tells Suraksha that she plans to get Raashi kidnapped. The goons kidnap Rashi and leave the place. Bhavana and Samarth inform Mithun that Selva has kidnapped Raashi. Soon, Selva calls Mithnu threatens to punish Raashi if he defies his orders.

While Selva's goons are sleeping, Raashi gets her phone and sends Mithun her location. Mithun follows it and saves Raashi. Upon learning that Suraksha is the new MD of the company, Mithun grows furious and leaves the place. Mithun vents at Raashi due to he repulsing that Surashka is leading his company. Mithun is upset with Samarth for letting Suraksha tag along with them and tells him not to disobey his orders again. To recover the company's losses, Suraksha reduces the salary of the organisation's cab drivers, who soon protest. Raashi arrives at his office and requests the cab drivers to stop protesting. Mithun dismisses her from the post of M.D. However, Samarth argues with Mithun that when Suraksha was appointed as M.D, Samarth was given veto power. Prabhakar confronts Girija and blames her for bringing difference between Samarth and Mithun by reminding Veto Power to Samarth.

Cast 
 Swaminathan Anantharaman as Mithun: A money minded CEO; Raashi's husband; Girija's eldest son 
 Vaishnavi as Raashi: Mithun's wife; a middle class girl and auto (appi) driver
 Yadu Shreshtha as Samarth aka Baabu: Mithun's younger brother; Girija's younger son; Suraksha's husband. 
 Pooja durganna as Suraksha: Raashi's elder sister; Samarth's wife; a money minded girl
 Ramya Balakrishna as Kavitha: Prabhakar's second wife; Bhavana's Step-mother
 Harini as Girija: Mithun and Samarth's mother 
 Radha Jayram as Anuradha: Raashi and Suraksha's mother
 Deepa as Bhavana: Mithun and Samarth's paternal cousin sister; Prabhakar's only daughter; Kavitha's step-daughter
 Unknown as Prabhakar: Mithun and  Samarth's paternal uncle; Kavitha's husband ; Bhavana's father

Crossover 
The serial had a crossover with Nammane Yuvarani for Maha sangama episodes.

Adaptations

References 

2019 Indian television series debuts
Indian television soap operas
Kannada-language television shows
Serial drama television series
Colors Kannada original programming